The Simplest Words is a 2015 collection of short stories and essays by the Australian author Alex Miller.

Peter Pierce describes this collection as 'a rich, generous compilation that enticingly refracts our perceptions of one of Australia's finest novelists'.

External links
 Peter Pierce, Review of The Simplest Words, Sydney Morning Herald, November 27, 2015 Review
 Michael Cathcart, Interview with Alex Miller, Radio National, 19 November 2015 Interview

References

Novels by Alex Miller
Allen & Unwin books
2015 short story collections